The Atlantic is a mixed-use residential skyscraper in the Atlantic Station neighborhood of Atlanta, Georgia. Located at the southeastern corner of 17th Street NW and State Street NW, The Atlantic is one of the core structures of the award-winning brownfield development.

History
Construction on The Atlantic began on March 21, 2007, with a groundbreaking ceremony by its developers, The Novare Group. By April 2009, the building had been topped-out, with only interior work to be finished before it opened later in the year.

Design
The Atlantic is designed in the Art Deco style of the 1930s, with an ornamental roof lined with spikes and turrets built by local ornamental metals fabricator Henry Incorporated. Sl

References

External links

Official site
Emporis database entry

Residential skyscrapers in Atlanta
Residential buildings completed in 2009